Jacky Mathijssen (born 20 July 1963 in Dilsen-Stokkem) is a Belgian former football player and manager who is currently managing the Belgium U21 squad.

Managerial statistics
As of 19 November 2019

Honours
2003 Runners-up Belgian Cup (Sint-Truidense VV)

References 
 Jacky Mathijssen nieuwe trainer Club Brugge
 Broos: "Jacky Mathijssen zegt soms onnodige dingen"

1963 births
Living people
Belgian footballers
Belgian football managers
R. Charleroi S.C. players
K.F.C. Winterslag players
K.R.C. Genk players
Sint-Truidense V.V. players
R. Charleroi S.C. managers
Club Brugge KV head coaches
K.S.C. Lokeren Oost-Vlaanderen managers
Beerschot A.C. managers
Oud-Heverlee Leuven managers
K.F.C. Lommel S.K. players
People from Dilsen-Stokkem
Footballers from Limburg (Belgium)
Association football goalkeepers